City Center at White Plains is a large mixed-use development shopping complex in downtown White Plains, New York. It features two 35-story apartment and condominium towers, known as The Tower at City Place,  of retail,  restaurants, entertainment space and parking facilities. City Center's opening in 2003 was part of a redevelopment scheme to revitalize downtown White Plains after a decades-long period of real estate and business decline in common with economic issues experienced by similar-sized cities at the end of the twentieth century. Beginning in the 1990s, economic stimulation in the New York City region and the wider national economy spurred growth in the commercial and office leasing markets in White Plains, helping to solidify the city's position as the dominant business center of Westchester County. The City Center is locally known as the spot where New York Knicks players often hang out due to their training facility in Greenburgh, New York, being located just 14 minutes away.

References

Buildings and structures in White Plains, New York
Shopping malls in New York (state)
Shopping malls established in 2003
Shopping malls in the New York metropolitan area